Mount Llano is a mountain peak,  high, in the foothills of the Prince Olav Mountains of Antarctica, standing  northeast of Mount Wade. It was surveyed by the U.S. Ross Ice Shelf Traverse Party (1957–58) under A.P. Crary, and named after American biologist George A. Llano, an authority on polar lichens. Llano was Program Manager for Biological and Medical Sciences at the Office of Polar Programs, National Science Foundation, 1960–77, and a member of several seasonal expeditions to Antarctica from 1957 to 1958 onwards.

References

Mountains of the Ross Dependency
Dufek Coast